Things named after physicist Julian Schwinger include the following:

Schwinger function
Schwinger model
Schwinger–Dyson equation
Schwinger's quantum action principle
Rarita–Schwinger equation
Lippmann–Schwinger equation
Schwinger–Tomonaga equation
Schwinger variational principle
Schwinger parametrization
Schwinger limit
Schwinger representation
Schwinger effect (Schwinger pair production)
Schwinger reversed-phase coupler
Fock–Schwinger gauge
Jordan-Schwinger map
Kubo-Martin-Schwinger state

schwinger